Bon Tuman or Bontuman may refer to:

Bon Tuman 1
Bon Tuman 2
Bon Tuman 3